Olsztyn (formerly Allenstein) is a city in north-eastern Poland.

Olsztyn may also refer to:
 Olsztyn Voivodeship, a former administrative unit in Poland
 Olsztyn, Silesian Voivodeship, a village in south Poland with ruins of a 14th-century castle
 , a Hansa A Type cargo ship in service 1947-72